Albert Strange (14 June 1905 – 21 July 1990) was an Australian rules footballer who played for the St Kilda Football Club in the Victorian Football League (VFL).

Notes

External links 

1905 births
1990 deaths
Australian rules footballers from Victoria (Australia)
St Kilda Football Club players